John Roethlisberger (born June 21, 1970) is a retired American gymnast. He is a three-time Olympian, representing the U.S. at the 1992 Olympics in Barcelona, 1996 Olympics in Atlanta, and 2000 Olympics in Sydney. He is also a four-time U.S. National all-around champion and a four-time U.S. National pommel horse champion. He also won back-to-back American Cup titles in 1995 and 1996. John was named Sportsperson of the Year in 1990, 1992, 1993, 1995, 1998 and 2000 and was a member of six World Championship teams throughout his career.

Collegiate career

Roethlisberger enrolled at the University of Minnesota where his father was head coach of the men's gymnastics team.  While there, he won the NCAA all-around title three times and the Big Ten Conference all-around title four times.  In 1993, Roethlisberger won the Nissen Award, and was a 1992 and 1993 Academic All-American. In 1993, John was named the winner of the NCAA Top-six Award, which is awarded annually to the top six student-athletes in the nation from all sports.

Commentary career
John has been in the commentary box for many Visa Championships, U.S. Classic, and Nastia Liukin Cup competitions for NBC. He also does commentary for the Big Ten and SEC Networks college gymnastic meets.

Personal life

John is the son of Fred Roethlisberger, who was a member of the 1968 U.S. Olympics gymnastics team.  His sister Marie Roethlisberger was an alternate on the 1984 U.S. Olympic gymnastics team.  He earned his BS degree in finance and international business. He now co-owns camp Flipfest, along with John Macready. Flipfest is located on Lake Frances in Crossville, Tennessee.

References

1970 births
Living people
American male artistic gymnasts
Gymnasts at the 1992 Summer Olympics
Gymnasts at the 1996 Summer Olympics
Gymnasts at the 2000 Summer Olympics
Minnesota Golden Gophers men's gymnasts
Olympic gymnasts of the United States
People from Fort Atkinson, Wisconsin
Pan American Games medalists in gymnastics
Pan American Games gold medalists for the United States
Pan American Games silver medalists for the United States
Gymnasts at the 1995 Pan American Games
Big Ten Athlete of the Year winners
Medalists at the 1995 Pan American Games